Floresta Azul is a municipality in the state of Bahia in the North-East region of Brazil. The estimated population in 2020 of this quaint municipality is 10,575 residents.

Declaration of Incorporation to the Brazilian State

"The Municipality of Floresta Azul assumes an indissoluble union with the State of Bahia and the Federative Republic of Brazil, constituted within the democratic State of law, within the sphere of local government, aiming, in its territorial area and with potential, its broad development, building a free, just and solidary community based on: Autonomy, Citizenship, Dignity of the Human Person, In the values of Work and Free Initiative, in Political pluralism. All power emanates from the People and in their name is exercised by their elected representatives or directly represented under the terms of the Organic Law, the State Constitution and the Federal Constitution."

Leadership

The first elected mayor of Floresta Azul was Themistocles Matos, or "Teta" Matos as he preferred to be called. Matos served as mayor from 1963 to 1966. Prior to his election, Matos administered the region for nearly 12 years and played a crucial role in developing the young town. By petitioning to have the town incorporated into the nation and recognized by the state, the administration of Floresta Azul became eligible to receive state and federal sponsorship for public service initiatives. You will find multiple streets, schools, and churches named after his family and other members of governance.

When it was time to pass the torch, Abidias Pedro dos Santos assumed office from 1967 to 1970. Santos was well known in the region, as he also simultaneously served as the mayor to the neighboring city, Itabuna.

Raimundo Silva Cardoso served one of the longest official terms in Floresta Azul, holding office in: 1971-1972, 1977-1982 and 1997-2000. In his near 13 years in office, Cardoso is remembered for his charm and efforts to develop the neighborhood of "Coquinhos" – a neighborhood that was historically economically depressed.

Marcelino Guilherme Santana served in office from 1973 to 1976, and is most noted for the creation of Manuel Saturnino Square. This square, named after a popular good samaritan in the community. This square sits at the heart of the town, and is a common place for lovers to stroll and children to play in.

Zely Teixeira de Carvalho also served between the reign of Raimundo Silva Cardoso, between the years of 1983 to 1988. Carvalho was known as "Mineirao", which is a demonym for someone who is from the state of Minas Gerais. Given his popularity – he beat his opponents by a landslide during elections. However, his 6-year mandate was cut short when a tragic accident took his life. He was succeeded by Antonio "Goiaba" Jose do Rosario. Antonio Jose do Rosario served from 1986 to 1988 and was previously the Vice Mayor of Zely Teixeira de Carvalho. His administration is noted for living in the shadow of his predecessors memory.

In 1988, Floresta Azul elected its first female mayor. Liete Carvalho Farias served in office from 1989 to 1992. Her presence in office was a stride for gender progress in the small town.

Raimundo Salvio's administration began in 2001 and lasted till 2004. He was the tenth mayor of the small town and he died one year after the end of his term.

Carlos Amilton Oliveira Santos is remembered as the notorious mayor of Floresta Azul, commonly known as "Garrafão" - which translates to big bottle, a nod to his vices. He served a total of 6 years (1993-1996 to 2005-2008) and his mandate was marred by corruption scandals. It was revealed that his administration was pocketing public funds when town employees exposed that they hadn't received their paychecks for more than 15 months. His troubled record was enough to make him a major sought after by the law and ousted by the resident population. In his second term, the small town was plastered all over national newspapers in a scandal expose over the lending practices of Banco Matone. Multiple reports and judicial measures have ensured that he does not return to hold public office.

Sanda Maisa Balduino Cardoso Marcelino previously served as the secretary of healthy in the municipality of Floresta Azul from 1997 to 2000. She is an alumna of the Catholic University of Salvador (class of 1988) and has been an active philanthropist in the town. Dr. Sandra has a long history of providing services to the community of Floresta Azul, especially the most needy. She is lauded for never refusing treatment due to a patients inability to pay, and is known for looking after everyone.  The Dr. Sandra is still the mayor of Floresta Azul.  Her vision is to service the population with first-rate education, active social assistance, youth sports, clean streets and avenues, restoring squares, paving streets and most importantly, developing the local economy. Dr. Sandra is in constant search for investments and alternatives for the municipality.

Economy

Historically, the early settlers of southern Bahia were lured by the climate of the Mata Atlantica and the lush green forests. Moreover, the region became synonymous with Cacau and Brazilian Cherry Wood, locally known as Jatoba. The name of the town translates to "Blue Florest" which refers to the deep colors of its flora. Today there are 2,180 rural properties in the Municipality of Floresta Azul, with approximately 5,000 inhabitants living in the countryside, and 960 properties producing only Cocoa. The estimated quantity of production is approximately 60,000 arrobas produced per year. Moreover, an estimated 540 properties are exclusively for Livestock, with a total herd of 25,000 cattle. It is believed that approximately 20,200 cattle are distributed for consumption per month and 4,800 cows are used in the production of milk, with a monthly collection that reaches 90,000 liters.

Religion

While Brazil is a predominantly catholic country, the rise of protestantism gained traction in the second half of the 20th century. Floresta Azul has not one, but two Seventh-Day Adventist Churches. There is the Seventh-Day Adventist Church of Teta Matos, built under the Themistocles Matos Administration, and the Seventh-Day Adventist Church II. Given the lack of communication, transportation, and sectarian literature between established American Seventh Day Adventist Communities and rural Brazilian ones, some local historians speculate that the presence of Sabbatarianism in the inlands of Brazil predates the arrival of the millerate, American-bred, Seventh-day Adventism and perhaps, denotes the presence of Marranos in the local community, that practiced in isolation till they had an entity to congregate under.

See also
List of municipalities in Bahia

References

Municipalities in Bahia